Square cut may refer to:

 A form of competitive swimwear
 A type of cut (cricket), a batting stroke in the game of cricket
 A form of hair cut